Lacinutrix iliipiscaria is a Gram-negative and rod-shaped bacterium from the genus of Lacinutrix which has been isolated from the intestine of a flounder (Paralichthys olivaceus).

References 

Flavobacteria
Bacteria described in 2015